Tsai Chin (born 1 September 1937) is a Chinese actress, singer, director, teacher, and author best known in America for her role as Auntie Lindo in the film The Joy Luck Club.

Chin's career spans more than six decades and three continents. She starred onstage in London's West End in The World of Suzie Wong and on Broadway in Golden Child. Chin appeared in two James Bond films, 39 years apart, as a Bond girl in You Only Live Twice; and in Casino Royale. She also appeared in the Marvel Cinematic Universe television series Agents of S.H.I.E.L.D. episode "The Only Light in the Darkness" (2014) as Lian May and in the feature film Shang-Chi and the Legend of the Ten Rings (2021) as Waipo. Her single, "The Ding Dong Song", recorded for Decca, hit the top of the music charts in Asia. She was the first acting instructor to be invited to teach acting in China after the Cultural Revolution, when China's universities reopened. In China, she is best known for her portrayal of Grandmother Jia in the 2010 TV drama series The Dream of Red Mansions.

Early life

Tsai Chin was born on 1 September 1937, in Tianjin (Tientsin), China, where her father was on tour. She is the third daughter of the Peking opera actor and singer Zhou Xinfang (1895—1975) and Lilian Qiu (AKA Lilian Ju; 1905–1968). Chin has a brother, restaurateur Michael Chow.

She grew up in the Shanghai French Concession, where (under her western name, "Irene Chow") she received a multilingual education at The Convent of the Sacred Heart, Mctyeire School (中西女中) in Shanghai and King George V School in Hong Kong. During her childhood, Tsai Chin was witness to colonial occupation, the Japanese invasion of China, Chinese Civil War, and the Communist takeover in 1949.

Education 
At the age of 17, she left Shanghai and was sent to England to study at The Royal Academy of Dramatic Art, where she was the first Chinese student in the art academy. Tsai Chin later became an Associate Member of The Royal Academy of Dramatic Art. She earned a master's degree at Tufts University in Boston, Massachusetts.

Career

Early years
Tsai Chin's first significant film role came when she was cast in the film The Inn of the Sixth Happiness (1958), in which she played the adopted daughter of Ingrid Bergman's character. Her big break, though, arrived when two Broadway shows came to London at the same time. Initially, Tsai Chin was cast as one of the two leads in the musical Flower Drum Song. However, she also auditioned for the play The World of Suzie Wong for which she was offered the title role. The Daily Mail quoted Chin as saying, "I had a terrible decision to make." She opted to star as Suzie Wong at The Prince of Wales Theatre, London (1959–1961), where she saw her name in lights for the first time. The play, generally panned by the critics, was a commercial hit. Chin drew good reviews, with Milton Shulman of the Evening Standard saying, "Tsai Chin is a lovely creature with all the vivacity, simplicity and gusts of unpredictable Eastern temperament." Harold Hobson of the Sunday Times said, "Tsai Chin who has cool clear beauty and considerable talent."

To compensate Tsai Chin for not being able to do the musical Flower Drum Song, producer, Donald Albery granted her request to sing a song in The World of Suzie Wong. She chose a lyrical Chinese song, "Second Spring" (第二春), which was translated into English as "The Ding Dong Song", by Lionel Bart. Tsai Chin recorded the song in 1960 for Decca Records in London. The single, arranged and conducted by music director Harry Robinson, became a hit, particularly in Asia.

Tsai Chin followed this success by recording several more singles and two LPs, later incorporating many of these songs, written specifically for her, into a cabaret act which she performed from 1961 to 1966. As well as touring her cabaret show throughout the United Kingdom, she also performed in London's most exclusive venues, including the Dorchester, the Savoy, the Society, and frequently Quaglino's and Allegro, sharing a bill with David Frost, then at the start of his illustrious career. Her cabaret act was also aired on television in Switzerland and the Netherlands. Variety called her a "Savvy entertainer, with most of her material tailor-made for her personality." London's Evening News was "impressed…by the way she held her audience, wasn't a murmur not even the clatter of one piece of cutlery."
 The World of Tsai Chin (1962) LK 4501 (mono and stereo)
 The Western World of Tsai Chin (1965) LK 4717 (mono)

1960s
Apart from her singing, she played Juicy Lucy in The Virgin Soldiers alongside Lynn Redgrave (1969), directed by John Dexter; helped to "assassinate" Sean Connery in You Only Live Twice (1967); worked for Michelangelo Antonioni on Blowup (1966) and for Fred Zinnemann in Man's Fate (1969), when the MGM studio unfortunately collapsed before filming barely started. From 1965 to 1969, she made five films opposite Christopher Lee as Lin Tang, daughter of Fu Manchu, a Chinese archvillain intent on dominating the world. As soon as she was in the position to do so, she fought to make Asian roles more truthful.

Her stage work at this time included leading roles in The Gimmick, with Donald Sutherland, at Criterion Theatre, West End (1962); The Magnolia Tree, at Royal Lyceum, Edinburgh (1966); Mrs. Frail in Love for Love, by William Congreve, in Watford (1970); and touring the United Kingdom in the title role of The Two Mrs. Carrolls (1969), with Paul Massie.

Tsai Chin made her television debut in the popular British hospital drama, Emergency Ward 10, ITV, then Dixon of Dock Green, BBC (1965), The Man of The World (1963), International Detective (1960) ITV, and The Troubleshooters (1967). In 1962, she traveled to New York City for the first time to guest star for a Christmas special  The Defenders. In 1964 she had a recurring role in  TW3, short for That Was The Week That Was, a popular satirical comedy show which was at the time a new concept in television presented by David Frost and produced by Ned Sherrin. She also co-starred with Roy Kinnear and Lance Percival in Five Foot Nine Show, and later starred in her own show, On Your Own for ITV (1965). She was invited to sing on a myriad of variety shows, talk shows and even game shows during this time. Her popularity was so high at that time that she even had a Chinese leopard in the London Zoo named after her.

The Cultural Revolution started in 1966. China shut itself off from the rest of the world and artists were purged, which eventually claimed the lives of both her parents; describing the 1960s in 2020 she said "While we in London began swinging and loving, China began swinging but hating. My parents suffered and died."

1970s
She said "Another problem for minority actors is that we don't often work with beautiful dialogue. And there were less chances of working with great directors and actors. That's when you can learn a lot." In 1972, Tsai Chin portrayed Wang Guangmei in The Subject of Struggle, a docudrama directed by Leslie Woodhead, for Granada. Her performance as Wang, wife of Liu Shaoqi, Chairman Mao's chief rival, and the film about her trial by the Red Guards were unanimously praised. "It's all brilliantly done" The Sunday Times; Of Chin's performance: "Played superbly," Clive James of The Observer; "The most important program of the night…brilliantly, unforgettably played by Tsai Chin," Tom Hutchinson, Evening Standard TV guide; and by critic Elizabeth Crawly, Evening Standard: "Tsai Chin leaves The World of Suzie Wong a long way behind with this brave, haggard performance." It was a role she could identify with, as her father was undergoing the same brutal treatment in China. Moreover, it was almost the first time Tsai Chin was asked to play a mature and intelligent person with depth and complexity, a far cry from her usual stereotypical roles. For the first time, she was portraying a real person, not a stereotype; in her autobiography, she writes: "For the first time, the artist and the woman within me met at last." This film would signify the end of the first phase of Tsai Chin's acting career. In London, Tsai Chin suffered financial ruin and experienced mental health problems, brought on by her parents' deaths. She only felt able to return to China after Mao's death.

In the mid-1970s, Chin went to America and became a member of The Cambridge Ensemble, a multi-racial experimental group in what was then known as "the finest theater in Boston." Under the direction of Joann Green, she was given the opportunity to play strong women in western classics, such as Klytemnestra in The Oresteia (1977), with Tim McDonough as Agamemnon. Kevin Kelly of The Boston Globe said, "Tsai Chin is ice-wonderful." Jon Lehman of The Patriot Ledger said, "great performance, a portrayal which shows us why Clytemnestra is one of the great woman characters of all time." In 1977, she played Hester Prynne in The Scarlet Letter, again with Tim McDonough as Rev. Arthur Dimmesdale. Ken Emerson of The Boston Phoenix said: "It takes a prodigiously gifted and subtle actress to follow Hawthorn's stage directions." Arthur Friedman in The Real Paper said, "Chin's portrayal is great because it reaches the heart without stooping to sentimental theatrics."

Chin began taking courses in Shakespearean studies at Harvard University. This was followed by her full-time enrollment at Tufts University, where she earned a master's degree in drama in 1980. She later received the Tufts University Alumni Association for Distinguished Service to Profession award in 1994. To supplement her scholarship, she taught acting and made her director's debut in Harold Pinter's The Lover (1979). Her Master's project was Ugo Betti's Crime on Goat Island, which starred fellow student Oliver Platt, and was her entry to American College Theatre Festival (1980).

The end of the 1970s coincided with the end of the Cultural Revolution in China. Mao died in 1976, artists and intellectuals were reinstated, and universities that were closed for ten years reopened. Chin became the first drama coach invited from abroad by the Minister of Culture to China since the Moscow Arts Theatre's withdrawal in the fifties.

1980s
On 29 March 1980, Chin met with her father's colleague Cao Yu (曹禺). The meeting took place in New York City, when Arthur Miller had hosted the playwright at Columbia University's School of International Affairs. This meeting resulted in an invitation to her by the Chinese Cultural Department to return to her home country after a quarter of a century's absence to teach a class at The Central Academy of Dramatic Art (中央戏剧学院), in Beijing in 1981. Prior to leaving for China, Jill Tweedie wrote an article about her in The Guardian: "After the age of 40, the little Suzie Wong Sex Kitten has remade herself into a mature, knowledgeable, exciting and excited human being." In 1982, she directed China's premiere production of William Shakespeare's The Tempest, "drawing inspiration from China's theatre tradition and Western internal acting."

After working in China, Chin returned to London, where she spent most of the decade serving as a cultural liaison between China and the United Kingdom, where, among many projects, Chin helped connect the British Arts Council with the theater arts in China and introduced Peking Opera productions. During this time she made many trips to Hong Kong to help transform Hong Kong Repertory Theatre to a fully professional theater company, teaching and introducing the works of Anton Chekhov to Hong Kong students. In Hong Kong, she directed the Asian premiere production of The Seagull (1982) and later Shakespeare's Twelfth Night (1988), as well as serving as a consultant to The Hong Kong Academy for Performing Arts (1993).

In 1988, her autobiography, Daughter of Shanghai, commissioned by Carmen Callil of Chatto & Windus, was published in England and became a worldwide best-seller. Polly Toynbee of The Guardian said, "The world of Tsai Chin has been a good deal more interesting than The World of Suzie Wong, the play that made her into a star." Richard West of The Sunday Telegraph wrote, "An extraordinary and occasionally tragic life story." Beth Duff in New York Times Book Review wrote, "Captivating account…skillfully interwoven the glamour and despair." Jean Fritz in the Washington Post and International Herald Tribune: "The heart of this book lies in her conflict as she tried to feel at home in two cultures…that is her triumph." In 1989, Daughter of Shanghai was voted "One of the Ten Best Books of the Year (十本好书)" by Hong Kong TV Cultural Group.

At the end of the 1980s, Chin resumed her acting career by returning to London's West End in David Henry Hwang's M. Butterfly (1989), starring Anthony Hopkins and Glen Goei, directed for the second time by John Dexter. It was during this production that Amy Tan, author of The Joy Luck Club, walked into her dressing room at the Shaftesbury Theatre, London.

1990s
In 1990, Chin played the title role in Henry Ong's one-woman drama, Madame Mao's Memories in London, which was particularly ironic due to the fact that Chin's father was personally purged by Madame Mao and Chin's mother died due to the brutality of the Red Guards. The play, directed by Glen Goei and performed at The Latchmere, was the hottest ticket in town. Sheridan Morley in the Herald Tribune International said: "She brings to this study of Madame Mao in defeat a tremendous dramatic courage and intensity….It is Tsai Chin's triumph to make us do rather more than just hate her." In her autobiography, she remarked, "I was determined to be a good deal fairer in my representation of her than she ever was of my father."

Chin's final United Kingdom acting performance was in Bodycount by Les Smith, for Rear Window, Channel 4 (1993).

In 1993, Chin took on a role that would energize her acting career and change her life yet again when she played the role of Auntie Lindo in the hugely popular The Joy Luck Club. When Joy Luck Club came out, she received rave reviews for her work. "Gene Siskel said of her performance, 'I hope Academy voters don't overlook her because she's not a household name. I am going to repeat her name.'" Those words were repeated in both Variety and Hollywood Reporter under the title "Memo to the Academy" Janet Maslin of The New York Times: "Despite its huge cast, the film is virtually stolen by Tsai Chin." But the film did not receive a single award in any category. The day after the award ceremonies, on the front page of The New York Times Arts & Leisure section, Maslin again wrote, "Did Disney back too many actresses?" Chin relocated to Los Angeles at the age of 62.

Hollywood
After moving to Hollywood, Chin was immediately given the lead in a one-hour television pilot Crowfoot (1994) by Magnum, P.I. producer Donald P. Bellisario. The series did not get picked up. In 1995, she played Brave Orchid in Maxine Hong Kingston's The Woman Warrior, directed by Sharon Ott, for which she received the Los Angeles Drama Critic Circle Award.

Chin played the role of Eng Sui-Yong in David Henry Hwang's Tony-nominated Golden Child, directed by James Lapine, which ultimately went to Broadway, Longacre Theatre (1995–1998), and for which she won an Obie Award and was nominated for The Helen Hayes Award. Laurie Winer, Los Angeles Times, commented on her performance as first wife: "Her descent into opium addiction is quite harrowing." Ben Brantley, The New York Times: "[Chin] suggests an Asian version of Bette Davis."

Other performances included roles in three Chay Yew plays: Half Lives, directed by Tim Dang at East West Players (1996); Wonderland, at La Jolla Playhouse; and adaptation of Federico García Lorca's The House of Bernarda Alba, playing Maria Josefa, the mad mother to Chita Rivera's Bernarda, directed by Lisa Peterson at Mark Taper Forum (2002).

Other work at this time included the voice of Popo in the daytime Emmy Award-winning Popo and The Magic Pearl (1996); an eccentric Madame Wu in the TV drama The Diary of Ellen Rimbauer (2003); and Grandmother Wu in Wendy Wu: Homecoming Warrior (2006), starring Brenda Song as Wendy Wu.

In 2003 and 2004, Chin performed at the Hollywood Bowl, in China Night, reciting poetry backed by a hundred-piece orchestra, conducted by John Mauceri, the founder of Hollywood Bowl Orchestra. She was a guest in numerous television series, most notably the recurring role as Helen, Sandra Oh's frivolous mother, in Grey's Anatomy, and recently Royal Pains.

Chin made numerous indie films and many features, notably appearing as Chairman Xu in Red Corner (1997), Auntie in Memoirs of a Geisha (2005), and Madame Wu in the James Bond thriller Casino Royale (2006). In 2008, she was offered the role of the Dowager Jia (贾母) in a lavish adaptation of Dream of the Red Chamber (红楼梦), China's most beloved classic novel from the eighteenth century. This was her first time back working as an actress in China and she spent more than one year completing the 50 episodes (2010).

Back in Los Angeles, Chin accepted the title role of a woman suffering from Alzheimer's in Nani, an AFI thesis film directed by Justin Tipping, which won the Student Academy Award and DGA Student Film Award (2012).

In 2014, she appeared in Marvel's Agents of S.H.I.E.L.D., reuniting with her Joy Luck Club co-star Ming Na, to play Melinda May's mother.

Chin appeared in two episodes of HBO's Getting On. Her autobiography, Daughter of Shanghai, has been published in ten versions.

Filmography

Film

 The Bridge on the River Kwai (1957) "Tokyo Rose" (voice)
 Yangtse Incident (1957) "Sampan girl"
 The Inn of the Sixth Happiness (1958) "Sui Lan"
 Violent Playground (1958) "Primrose" 
 The Treasure of San Teresa (1959) "1st girl in fight"
 The Cool Mikado (1962) "Pitti Sing"
 The Face of Fu Manchu (1965) "Lin Tang"
 Invasion (1966) "Nurse Lim" 
 Blowup (1966) "Receptionist"
 The Brides of Fu Manchu (1966) "Lin Tang"
 The Vengeance of Fu Manchu (1967) "Lin Tang"
 You Only Live Twice (1967) "Ling" (appearing with her brother, Michael Chow)
 The Blood of Fu Manchu (1968) "Lin Tang"
 The Castle of Fu Manchu (1969) "Lin Tang"
 Man's Fate (1969) (unfinished)
 The Virgin Soldiers (1969) "Juicy Lucy"
 Rentadick (1972) "Madam Greenfly"
 The Joy Luck Club (1993) "Auntie Lindo"
 Red Corner (1997) "Chairman Xu" (dir. Jon Avnet)
 The Magic Pearl (1997) "Popo" voice
 Journey from the Heart (1999) "Grandma Lee"
 The Gold Cup (2000) "Ma"
 Titan A.E. (2000) "Old woman" (voice)
 Long Life, Happiness & Prosperity (2002) "Hun Ping Wong"
 The Interpreter (2005) "Luan"
 Memoirs of a Geisha (2005) "Auntie"
 Wendy Wu: Homecoming Warrior (2006) "Grandma Wu"
 Casino Royale (2006) "Madam Wu"
 Year of the Fish (2007) "Mrs. Su"
 Nani (2011) "Nani" 
 A Leading Man (2012) "Lo Mei An"
 Now You See Me 2 (2016) "Bu Bu"
 The Jade Pendant (2016) "Madame Pong"
 Lucky Grandma (2019) "Grandma" 
 Abominable (2019) "Nai Nai" (voice)
 Shang-Chi and the Legend of the Ten Rings (2021) Waipo

Television

 International Detective (1960) (TV series) "Suma Hau"
 The Defenders (1961) (TV series) "Parma Gideon"
 Man of the World (1963) (TV series) "Souen"
 That Was The Week That Was (1963) (TV series)
 The Five Foot Nine Show (1964) (TV)
 On Your Own (1965) (TV)
 Dixon of Dock Green (1965) (TV series) "Ana Man Ning"
 The Troubleshooter (1967) (TV series) 
 The Subject of Struggle (1971) (TV docudrama) "Wang Kwangmei"
 Window: Bodycount (1973) (TV)
 Chicago Hope (1994) (TV series)
 Crowfoot (1994) (TV series) "Det. Lisa Ishima"
 Byrds of Paradise (1994) (TV series) "Teacher"
 Sisters (1994) (TV series) "Rita Kwan"
 The West Side Waltz (1995) (TV)
 Due South Chinatown "Mrs Lee" (1995 TV Series)
 Under Suspicion (1995) (TV series)
 Fantasy Island (1998) (TV series) "Rita"
 Strong Medicine (2001) (TV series) "Jin Jae"
 The Diary of Ellen Rimbauer (2003) (TV) "Madam Wu"
 Avatar: The Last Airbender (2005) (TV series) "Aunt Wu" (voice)
 Grey's Anatomy (2005) (TV series) "Mrs. Helen Rubenstein"
 The Evidence (2006) (TV series) "Joon Huang"
 Chasing the Hollywood Dream (2005) (TV)
 Hollywood Chinese (2007) (TV documentary)
 Side Order of Life (2007) (TV series) "Mai Thuy"
 The Dream of Red Mansions (original title: Hong Loumeng 红楼梦) (2010) Leading role: "The Dowager Jia (贾母)" 50 episodes – China
 Royal Pains (2012) (TV series) "Mrs. Sesumi"
 Nice Girls Crew (2012) (Web series) "Lady Lee"
 Marvel's Agents of S.H.I.E.L.D. (2014) (TV series) Lian May
 Getting On (2014) (TV series) "Ruth Lee"
 We Bare Bears (2018) (TV series) "Linda" (voice)
 The Three-Body Problem (TBA)

Stage work
 The Final Ace (1956) "Jennie"; New Lindsey Theatre, London
 The Chinese Classical Theatre (1957) "Compere"; The Drury Lane, London
 Princess and the Swineherd (1957) "Princess"; Arts Theater, London
 Ali Baba (1958) "Princess"; Dundee Repertory Theatre, Doncaster, UK
 The World of Suzie Wong (1959) Title role; Prince of Wales Theatre, London
 Night of 100 Stars (1960) Revue sketch in aid of Actor's orphanage, led by Lord Olivier, London
 The Gimmick (1962) "Gabby Lee"; Criterion Theatre, London
 The Magnolia Tree (1966) "Kesa"; Royal Lyum, Edinburgh
 The Two Mrs. Carrols (1969) Title role; UK tour
 Love For Love (1970) "Mrs. Frail"; Palace Theatre, Watford, UK
 Fanshen (1976) "Hu Hsueh-chen"; The People's Theatre, Boston
 The Orestaia (1977) "Clytemnestra"; The Cambridge Ensemble, Boston
 Agamemnon (1977) "Clytemnestra"; Norfork Prison for Lifers, Massachusetts
 The Scarlet Letter (1977) "Hester Prynne"; The Cambridge Ensemble, Boston. (Best performance, The Real Paper)
 Puntila and Matti (1977) "Eva"; The Cambridge Ensemble, Boston
 Br'er Rabbit (1978) "Sister Terrpin"; The Cambridge Ensemble, Boston
 M. Butterfly (1989) "Suzuki" "Comrade Chin"; Haymarket Theater, Leicester, UK; Shaftesbury Theatre, London
 Madame Mao (1990) "Madame Mao"; Liverpool Playhouse
 Madame Mao's Memories (1990) "Madame Mao"; Latchmere Theatre, London
 The Woman Warrior (1995) "Brave Orchid"; James A. Doolittle Theatre, Los Angeles (LA Drama Critics Circle Award)
 Fishes (1995) "Mother," "Fish"; Taper Lab New Work Festival, Los Angeles
 Golden Child (1996) "Eng Sui-Yong"; The Public Theater, New York
 Half Lives (1996) "woman"; East West Players, Los Angeles
 Golden Child--"Eng Sui-Yong": (1997) South Coast Repertory; (1989) Victoria Theatre, Singapore; (1998) ACT, San Francisco; (1998) The Kennedy Center, Washington, D.C. (nom. Helen Hayes Award); Longacre Theater, New York.
 Fabric (1999) "Auntie Suni"; Singapore Arts Festival
 Wonderland (1999) "Woman"; La Jolla Playhouse, La Jolla, California
 House of Bernarda Alba (2002) "Maria"; Mark Taper Forum, Los Angeles
 China Night (2003–04) Hollywood Bowl
 The Vagina Monologues (2007) "I Was There in the Room"; Aratani Japan Asian Theater, Los Angeles

Discography
 The Ding Dong Song/The Second Spring (第二春) F-11192 (7" single)
 The Chinese Charleston/How Shall I Do It? F-11489 (7" single)
 Buttons and Bows/Woa Yaw Nee F-11595 (7" single)
 Any Old Iron/School in Cheltenham F-11737 (7" single)
 Good Morning, Tokyo (1964 Tokyo Olympic theme for British Television)/I Love A Man (from "Maggie May") F-12039 (7" single)
 The World of Tsai Chin (LP)
 The Western World of Tsai Chin (LP)

Directing
 The Journey (1978) Boston Public Schools
 The Lover (1979) Tufts University
 Crime on Goat Island (1980) Tufts University
 The Tempest (1981) Central Academy of Dramatic Art, Beijing (中央戏剧学院)
 The Seagull (1982) Hong Kong Repertory Theatre
 Twelfth Night (1987) Hong Kong Repertory Theatre

Teaching
 Drama Therapy (1963) Holloway Prison, London
 Theatre workshop for adolescents in Chinatown (1976) Boston
 Acting instructor (1977–1979) Tufts University Drama Department, Medford, Massachusetts
 Workshop for Title VII Theatre Arts Staff (1978) The School Committee of the City of Boston
 Acting instructor (1981) Central Academy of Dramatic Art, Beijing (中央戏剧学院， 表演系78班)
 Master Class (1982) Shanghai Academy of Dramatic Art, Shanghai (上海戏剧学院)

Awards
 Associate Member, Royal Academy of Dramatic Art, London (1964)
 Voted one of London's "Women of the Year" (1964)
 The London Zoo names Chinese leopard "Tsai Chin" (1965)
 The World Who's Who of Women, Cambridge, England (1973)
 Honorary Board of National Center for Women in Performing and Media Arts, Boston (1978)
 Distinguished Service to Profession, Tufts University Alumni Association (1994)
 Los Angeles Drama Critics Circle (1995) The Woman Warrior
 Obie Award (1997) Golden Child
 Helen Hayes Award nominee (1998) Golden Child
 Ammy Lifetime Achievement Awards
 Achievement Award (2007) Chinese Performing Arts Foundation, San Francisco

References

External links
 
 
 Interview

1933 births
Living people
Chinese emigrants to England
Actresses from Tianjin
Alumni of RADA
Chinese women singers
20th-century Chinese actresses
21st-century Chinese actresses
Chinese film actresses
Chinese television actresses
Tufts University alumni
Actresses from Shanghai
Chinese emigrants to the United States
Alumni of King George V School, Hong Kong